The 2019 UEFA Nations League Finals was the final tournament of the 2018–19 edition of the UEFA Nations League, the inaugural season of the international football competition involving the men's national teams of the 55 member associations of UEFA. The tournament was held in Portugal from 5 to 9 June 2019, and was contested by the four group winners of Nations League A. The tournament consisted of two semi-finals, a third place play-off, and final to determine the inaugural champions of the UEFA Nations League.

Portugal won the final 1–0 against the Netherlands to become the inaugural champions of the UEFA Nations League.

Format
The Nations League Finals took place in June 2019 and was contested by the four group winners of League A. The four teams were each drawn into a five-team group (rather than a six-team group) for the UEFA Euro 2020 qualifying group stage, thereby leaving the June 2019 window available for the Nations League Finals.

The competition was played in a knockout format, consisting of two semi-finals, a third place play-off, and a final. The semi-final pairings, along with the administrative home teams for the third place play-off and final, were determined by means of an open draw on 3 December 2018.

The tournament took place over five days, with the first semi-final (which featured the host team) on 5 June, the second semi-final on 6 June, and the third place play-off and final on 9 June. The winners of the final were crowned as the inaugural champions of the UEFA Nations League.

The Nations League Finals were played in single-leg knockout matches. If the scores were level at the end of normal time, 30 minutes of extra time were played, where each team was allowed to make a fourth substitution. If the score was still level, the winner was determined by a penalty shoot-out. All matches in the tournament utilised the goal-line technology system. On 3 December, UEFA confirmed that the video assistant referee (VAR) system would be used for the Nations League Finals.

Qualified teams
The four group winners of League A qualified for the Nations League Finals.

Host selection
Portugal was confirmed as the host country by the UEFA Executive Committee during their meeting on 3 December 2018 in Dublin, Republic of Ireland. Only League A teams could bid for the Nations League Finals, and only one of the four participants was selected as hosts. The Nations League Finals was held in two stadiums, each with a seating capacity of at least 30,000.

On 9 March 2018, UEFA announced that Italy, Poland, and Portugal expressed interest in bidding prior to the deadline. The deadline to submit their dossiers was 31 August 2018. As all three associations formed Group A3, the group winner was in line to be appointed as the host, provided that the associations submitted bids that met UEFA's requirements. Poland were relegated from Group A3 on 14 October 2018, leaving Italy and Portugal as potential hosts. On 17 November 2018, Portugal won Group A3 and advanced to the Finals, thereby automatically winning hosting rights, which were confirmed by the UEFA Executive Committee on 3 December 2018, the same day as the Nations League Finals draw.

Venues
In their bid dossier, the Portuguese Football Federation proposed Estádio do Dragão in Porto and Estádio D. Afonso Henriques in Guimarães as the venues.

Draw
The draw took place on 3 December 2018, 14:30 CET (13:30 local time), at the Shelbourne Hotel in Dublin, Republic of Ireland. No seeding was applied in the draw. The first two balls drawn were allocated as the administrative home teams for each semi-final pairing, with the next two balls drawn allocated as their opponents. For scheduling purposes, the semi-final pairing involving the host team was considered to be semi-final 1. The administrative home team for both the third place play-off and final were then jointly drawn between semi-final 1 and 2.

Squads

Each national team had to submit a squad of 23 players, three of whom had to be goalkeepers, at least ten days before the opening match of the tournament. If a player became injured or ill severely enough to prevent his participation in the tournament before his team's first match, he was replaced by another player.

Bracket

All times are local, WEST (UTC+1).

Semi-finals

Portugal vs Switzerland

Netherlands vs England

Third-place play-off

Final

Statistics

Goalscorers

Assists

Awards
Team of the Tournament
The Team of the Tournament was selected by UEFA's technical observers, and includes at least one player from each of the four participants.

UEFA also announced a team of the tournament based on the FedEx Performance Zone player rankings.

Player of the Tournament
The Player of the Tournament award was given to Bernardo Silva, who was chosen by UEFA's technical observers.
 Bernardo Silva

Young Player of the Tournament
The SOCAR Young Player of the Tournament award was open to players born on or after 1 January 1996. The award was given to Frenkie de Jong, as chosen by UEFA's technical observers.
 Frenkie de Jong

Top Scorer
The "Alipay Top Scorer Trophy", given to the top scorer in the Nations League Finals, was awarded to Cristiano Ronaldo, who scored a hat-trick in the semi-final against Switzerland. The ranking was determined using the following criteria: 1) goals in Nations League Finals, 2) assists in Nations League Finals, 3) fewest minutes played in Nations League Finals, 4) goals in league phase 5) fewest yellow and red cards in Nations League Finals, 6) fewest yellow and red cards in league phase.

Goal of the Tournament
The SOCAR Goal of the Tournament was decided by online voting. A total four goals were in the shortlist, chosen by UEFA's technical observers, from two players: Cristiano Ronaldo (all three goals against Switzerland) and Matthijs de Ligt (against England). Ronaldo won the award for his second goal against Switzerland.

Discipline
A player was automatically suspended for the next match for receiving a red card, which could be extended for serious offences. Yellow card suspensions did not apply in the Nations League Finals.

The following suspensions were served during the tournament:

Prize money
The prize money to be distributed was announced in October 2018. In addition to the €2.25 million solidarity fee for participating in the Nations League, the four participants received an additional €2.25 million for winning their groups and qualifying for the Nations League Finals.

In addition, the participants received payment based on performance:
 Winners: €6 million
 Runners-up: €4.5 million
 Third place: €3.5 million
 Fourth place: €2.5 million

This meant that the maximum amount of solidarity and bonus fees for the UEFA Nations League winners was €10.5 million.

References

External links

2019 UEFA Nations League Finals, UEFA.com
UEFA Technical Report

 
Finals
2019
2018–19 in Portuguese football
International association football competitions hosted by Portugal
June 2019 sports events in Portugal
2018–19 in Swiss football
2018–19 in Dutch football
2018–19 in English football
Sports competitions in Porto
Sport in Guimarães